Puerto Rico Highway 53 (PR-53) or unsigned Interstate PR3 is a main tollway that is parallel to Puerto Rico Highway 3, which goes from Fajardo to Salinas. It will connect the cities of Fajardo, Ceiba, Naguabo, Humacao, Yabucoa, Maunabo, Patillas, Arroyo, Guayama and Salinas, thus bordering the entire eastern and southeastern coasts of Puerto Rico. Its northern terminus is at PR-3 and PR-194 in Fajardo, and its south terminus is at PR-52 in Salinas.

Route description
The highway consists of five toll plazas; these are at Ceiba Norte, Humacao Norte, Humacao Sur (near Palmas del Mar), Guayama and Salinas. All toll plazas have AutoExpreso lanes.

Recently , between Yabucoa and Maunabo, includes the last tunnel, Vicente Morales, was opened in October 2008. The lanes in the Yabucoa segments were divided by painted yellow lines and no-passing zone boards, but a concrete median barrier had to be installed because some cars still passed others going slower, resulting in deadly head-on collisions; illegal night races also had deadly consequences.

PR-53 is the tollway with the lowest traffic in Puerto Rico, and very few congestion jams have been reported. PR-53 does not enter highly populated towns (none of them are over 100,000; the largest are Fajardo, Humacao and Guayama) and is not close to increase its traffic due to the fact that most of the population in the east part of Puerto Rico live in the San Juan metro area, Caguas and Cayey, cities where PR-53 makes no appearance; and the main traffic in Humacao is mostly located on the PR-30 and PR-60 highways. The center/business area of Humacao is accessed via PR-30 and PR-60, not by PR-53. Because of this, PR-53 has no more than two lanes per direction in the constructed segments and will probably have no more than two lanes per direction in the entire length.

PR-53 is also prone to flooding in the areas near Naguabo and Fajardo: during heavy rains, it is sometimes closed to traffic. There are current proposals to convert PR-3 from Rio Grande to Fajardo into a freeway to provide a controlled-access route between PR-53's northern terminus and the second phase of PR-66. At the rate of construction, the entire PR-53 corridor might be completed within the next ten years. The first segment of PR-53 was opened in 1994; from Fajardo to Ceiba, in 1994, and from Ceiba to Humacao, in 1997, except between exit 13 and 17 in summer 2002.

Tolls

Exit list

See also

 Interstate Highways in Puerto Rico
 List of highways numbered 53

References

External links

 
 Hawaii Highways: Puerto Rico – Puerto Rico Interstate Photographs (2002)

053
53
53
Tolled sections of Interstate Highways